The Guh massacre was a mass extrajudicial killing that took place in Guh in the Tigray Region of Ethiopia during the Tigray War, on 8 May 2021. 
Guh is a village that belongs to tabiya Debre Selam, woreda Hawzen, Eastern zone of Tigray. It is a small rural settlement on steep slopes below the fifth-century rock-hewn church of Abuna Yemata.

Massacre
The Eritrean Defence Forces (EDF) killed 19 civilians in Guh (Eastern Tigray) on 8 May 2021. Most of the victims in the attack were women and young children.

Perpetrators
The Guardian reported the perpetrators of this massacre as being Eritrean soldiers. Witnesses mention that one female Eritrean soldier was leading the massacre.

Victims
“The Guardian” mentions 19 victims of this massacre, 16 of whom have been identified.

Reactions
“The Guardian” stated that this additional report of a cold-blooded killing of unarmed civilians, including young children, will add to international pressure on Ethiopian authorities for a ceasefire to stem such abuses and allow humanitarian aid into Tigray.

After months of denial by the Ethiopian authorities that massacres occurred in Tigray, a joint investigation by OHCHR and the Ethiopian Human Rights Commission was announced in March 2021.

While the Ethiopian government promised that Eritrean troops will be pulled out from Tigray, the Eritrean government denies any participation in warfare in Tigray, let alone in massacres.

References

External links
World Peace Foundation: Starving Tigray

2021 in Ethiopia
2021 massacres of the Tigray War
April 2021 crimes in Africa
Massacres committed by Eritrea